Quran desecration is the treatment of the Quran, in its original Arabic form, in a way that might be considered disrespectful or insulting.

Respect for the Quran as a holy book, as in other faiths, is an important element of religious faith in Islam, Muslims always treat the printed book with reverence and perform wudu, or ritual washing, before touching the work. Conversely, intentionally defiling or defacing copies the book is regarded by Muslims as blasphemous. 

The disposal of worn copies is also of concern to Muslims. Because the Quran contains no specifics on how to dispose of a worn or defective text, different and conflicting methods of disposal have been adopted in different regions by different sects. According to Islamic historian Michael Cook the Quran should be wrapped in cloth and buried on holy ground where it is unlikely to be trampled on or "safely" placed where it is unlikely to come into contact with impurity. Burning, when carried out respectfully, is also considered acceptable, and Saudi Arabia, for instance, destroys Qurans that fall short of state standards by burning to avoid soiling the pages.

Intentionally desecrating a copy of the Quran is punishable by imprisonment in some countries and could lead to a death sentence in Afghanistan, Saudi Arabia, Somalia and Pakistan, or up to life imprisonment in Pakistan, according to Article 295-B of the Penal Code.

Proper treatment

The Quran, in its original Arabic form, is believed by Muslims to be the literal word of God, and intentionally insulting the Quran by defiling or defacing copies is regarded by Muslims as blasphemous. Conversely, respecting the Quran is an important element of religious faith in Islam.

Wudu, or ritual washing, must be performed before a Muslim may touch the Quran and Muslims must always treat the printed book with reverence, which may even extend to excerpts of text.

Respectful disposal

The disposal of worn copies is also of concern to Muslims. Because the Quran contains no specifics on how to dispose of a worn or defective text, different and conflicting methods of disposal have been adopted in different regions by different sects. According to Islamic historian Michael Cook the Quran should be wrapped in cloth and buried on holy ground where it is unlikely to be trampled on or "safely" placed where it is unlikely to come into contact with impurity.

According to Arab News, Muslims are forbidden to recycle or pulp worn-out copies of the text; instead, burning or burying the worn-out copies in a respectful manner is required.

Saudi Arabia, for instance, destroys Qurans of pilgrims that fall short of state standards. The preferred method is by burning, to avoid soiling the pages.

Statutory regulation
Intentionally desecrating a copy of the Quran is punishable by imprisonment in some countries and could lead to a death sentence in Afghanistan, Saudi Arabia, and Somalia, or up to life imprisonment in Pakistan, according to Article 295-B of the Penal Code.

Notable instances of desecration or controversy

Pre-1924 Qurans dumped in the Nile

Following the printing of the 1924 "royal"  edition (amīriyya)" a large number of pre-1924 Qurans were destroyed by dumping them in the river Nile.

2005 - Guantanamo

In mid-2005, allegations of deliberate desecration of the Quran in front of Muslim prisoners at the United States military Guantanamo Bay detention camp in Cuba fueled widespread controversy and led to ensuing Muslim riots. A US military investigation confirmed four instances of Quran desecration by US personnel (two of which were described as "unintentional"), and fifteen instances of desecration by Muslim prisoners.  According to CBC News, "The statement did not provide any explanation about why the detainees might have abused their own Holy books."  In May 2005, a report in Newsweek, claiming that it was U.S. interrogators who desecrated the Quran at the Guantanamo Bay base, further sparking Muslim unrest.

2010 Dove World Quran-burning controversy

In 2010, Christian pastor Terry Jones of the Dove World Outreach Center, a church in Gainesville, Florida, provoked islamist condemnation after announcing plans to burn a Quran on the anniversary of the Islamic terrorist September 11 attacks on the United States. He later cancelled the plans;  however, on March 20, 2011, he oversaw the burning of a Quran.  In response, Muslims in Afghanistan rioted and 12 people were killed.

In the 2011 Louis Theroux documentary America's Most Hated Family in Crisis, Megan Phelps of the Westboro Baptist Church explained in an interview that they deliberately and publicly burned a copy of the Quran.

2012 - Bangladesh

On September 29, an Islamic mob estimated at 25,000 vandalized and torched Buddhist temples, shrines, and houses, along with Hindu temples as incited by an alleged Facebook Buddhist posting of an image depicting the desecration of a Quran. The violence started in Ramu Upazila in Cox's Bazar District and later spread to other areas of Bangladesh.

2012/2015 - Afghanistan

In February 2012, protests broke out in various parts of Afghanistan over the improper disposal of Qurans at the US military Bagram Air Base. Protesters shouted "Death to America" and burned US flags. At least 30 people were killed and hundreds injured. Also,6 U.S. soldiers were killed  after members of the Afghan National Security Forces turned their weapons on them and the Afghan protesters.

On March 19, 2015, Farkhunda Malikzada, a 27-year-old Afghan woman, was publicly beaten and slain by a mob of hundreds of people in Kabul. Farkhunda had previously been arguing with a mullah named Zainuddin, in front of a mosque where she worked as a religious teacher, about his practice of selling charms at the Shah-Do Shamshira Mosque, the Shrine of the King of Two Swords, a religious shrine in Kabul. During this argument, Zainuddin reportedly falsely accused her of burning the Quran. Police investigations revealed that she had not burned anything. A number of prominent public officials turned to Facebook immediately after the death to endorse the murder. After it was revealed that she did not burn the Quran, the public reaction in Afghanistan turned to shock and anger. Her murder led to 49 arrests; three adult men received twenty-year prison sentences, eight other adult males received sixteen year sentences, a minor received a ten-year sentence, and eleven police officers received one-year prison terms for failing to protect Farkhunda. Her murder and the subsequent protests served to draw attention to women's rights in Afghanistan.

2013 to 2020 Saudi Arabia
In 2013, over 50 copies of the Quran were found in different storm water inlets of the sewage system of the city of Taif, in the Mecca Province of Saudi Arabia.
In the same year, there were protests in Saudi Arabia after reports of prison officials in Al-Haer province insulting the Quran.

In 2014, torn copies of the Quran were found in garbage cans in the same city of Taif.

In 2016, Qurans were found to have been put in the garbage by the Embassy of Saudi Arabia in Morocco, causing outrage across Morocco.

In 2017 again a large number of Quran copies were found in the sewage system of Taif.

In 2019, torn copies of the Quran were found in a trash dump in the city of Khaybar.

In 2020 April, a man recorded a video of himself desecrating and stepping on the Quran in Saudi Arabia and uploaded the video on social media. The act was widely condemned on social media.

2017–present Denmark
 
It has been legal to desecrate Qurans in Denmark since 2017. Burnings of the Quran, sometimes wrapped in bacon, and other forms of desecration such as throwing the book to the ground is a regular occurrence at rallies of the party Stram Kurs and party leader Rasmus Paludan. Paludan calls on his supporters to urinate on the Quran, calls it a "shit book", and the Prophet Muhammad a pedophile murderer.

2019–present Norway
Since Lars Thorsen became leader of the Stop Islamisation of Norway group in 2019, the group has started repeatedly burning the Quran at their rallies in Norway. The group has also ripped apart and spit on copies of the Quran, and dragged it around on a leash like a dog.

2020–present Sweden 
Since 2020, the  Danish party Stram Kurs have orchestrated Quran burnings in multiple Swedish cities. Most recently, in April 2022 the Stram Kurs leader Rasmus Paludan planned several Quran burnings. This resulted in numerous riots in Swedish cities against the planned desecrations, notably the 2020 Sweden riots and 2022 Sweden riots.

Others

In March 2013, the al Qaeda English-language magazine Inspire published a poster stating "Wanted dead or alive for crimes against Islam" with a prominent image of Terry Jones, known for public Quran burning events.  Iran's news agency, IRIB, reported on April 8, 2013, that Terry Jones planned another Quran burning event on September 11, 2013. On April 11, IRIB published statements from an Iranian MP who said the West must stop the event and warned that "the blasphemous move will spark an uncontrollable wave of outrage among over 1.6 billion people across the globe who follow Islam." In Pakistan, protesters set the American flag and effigy of the US pastor Terry Jones on fire, condemning the 9/11 plan, according to an April 14, 2013 article in The Nation.

In October 2013, a Turkish woman was arrested on suspicion of blasphemy and inciting religious hatred after allegedly stepping on Quran and then posting the picture on Twitter.

Proposals to recycle old Qurans in Pakistan have met with opposition.

On July 31, 2016, a couple of days after the Normandy church attack, several copies of the Quran at the multi-faith room of Mater Dei Hospital in Malta were desecrated when slices of pork were laid inside the book. The perpetrators also left a photo of Jacques Hamel, the Catholic priest murdered during the attack, with the caption "Victim of Islam".

Turkey summoned the Dutch ambassador in Ankara following "a vile attack" on the Quran in the Hague in January 2023. Ambassador Joep Wijnands was told by the Foreign Ministry that Türkiye condemned "the heinous and despicable act" and demanded the Netherlands not to allow such "provocative acts".

See also
Desecration
Host desecration
Volksverhetzung

References

  [s] - The major sources about punishment are:

External links
 Afghan protest over 'burnt Koran', BBC, 25 October 2009.

Quran-related controversies
Anti-Islam sentiment
Counter-jihad